Senator Hersey may refer to:

Ira G. Hersey (1858–1943), Maine State Senate
Samuel F. Hersey (1812–1875), Maine State Senate

See also
Stephen S. Hershey Jr. (born 1964), Maryland State Senate